The Norwegian Conservative Party's Women's Association was founded in 1925 to represent the interests of women members of the Conservative Party. In June 1994 it was dissolved, to be replaced by Høyres Kvinneforum (Conservative Party's Women's Network).

The Women's Association built on the experience of the earlier Høirekvinneklubben (Conservative Women's Club) which had been created in 1910 by Elise Heyerdahl. With the establishment of the association in 1925, it was hoped that by rejuvenating their work, women would be able to play a more effective political role.

Women's Association leaders (1925–1994)
1925 Sara Christie
1927 Augusta Stang
1937 Judith Gram Skarland
1945 Johanna Thorén
1958 Claudia Olsen
1966 Berte Rognerud
1975 Karin Hafstad
1979 Mona Røkke
1985 Astrid Nøklebye Heiberg
1989 Siri Frost Sterri
1993 Erna Solberg

References

Conservative Party (Norway)
Feminist organisations in Norway
1925 establishments in Norway
1994 disestablishments in Norway
Organizations established in 1925
Organizations disestablished in 1994